Pollionnay is a commune in the Rhône department in eastern France. The composer and organist Eugène Reuchsel (1900–1988) died in Pollionnay.

See also
Communes of the Rhône department

References

Communes of Rhône (department)
Rhône communes articles needing translation from French Wikipedia